Tom Evans (born 3 February 1992) is a British long-distance runner and a former British Army Captain. In 2020, he competed in the men's race at the 2020 World Athletics Half Marathon Championships held in Gdynia, Poland. He finished third in his Ultra-Trail du Mont-Blanc (UTMB) 2022.

Races 

 ‘CCC’ (Courmayeur-Champex-Chamonix) race during the UTMB week - Winner, 2018
 Ultra-Trail du Mont-Blanc (UTMB) - Podium (Third Position), 2022

See Also 

 Kilian Jornet

References

External links 
 

Living people
1992 births
Place of birth missing (living people)
British male long-distance runners
British male marathon runners